Al Dhahirah (Muḥāfaẓat aẓ-Ẓāhirah) is one of the governorates (muhafazah) of Oman. It was previously a region (mintaqah). It became a governorate on 28 October 2011.

Economy

The governorate is the location of the biggest oil field in Oman, Yibal, which started operations in 1968.

Provinces
Adh Dhahirah Governorate consists of three provinces (wilayat):
Ibri
Yanqul
Dhank

Regional Subdivision Review before 2007
Until October 2006, two more former wilayat (Provinces) were part of this region: Al Buraymi and Mahdha. Al Buraimi Governorate was created from them in October 2006, as a new governorate. As well, a third wilaya (Province), of Al Sunaynah was created from rural parts of Al Buraymi and Mahdha.

Demographics

References

 
 
Governorates of Oman